Montessori-Based Dementia Programming 

(MBDP) is a way of helping older adults who are suffering from cognitive and/or physical impairments. This method is based on the ideas of the educator Maria Montessori. Physicians have noticed that after using MBDP, patients with dementia have shown increased levels of engagement and participation. Even though this method can not cure or prevent Alzheimer's disease, it can still help to improve many aspects of the lives of those with Alzheimer's disease.

Principles 
Montessori-Based Dementia Programming uses rehabilitation principles of guided repetition, and task breakdown each progressing from simple to complex. Additionally, principles of dementia interventions such as external cue usage and reliance on implicit memory are used. Examples of activities include reading groups and memory games.

Where it is used 

This method of helping persons with dementia and other memory impairments was shown to be effective  in a number of different contexts.  These include long-term care, assisted living, independent living and home-based care. It is also used in intergenerational programming where memory impaired older adults and young children participate together in Montessori-based activities.

Who uses it 

Montessori-based Dementia Programming is primarily used by recreational therapists and activities professionals.  However, Dr. Cameron Camp stresses that any staff member of a nursing facility (nurses, social workers, dietary staff) should be trained to implement Montessori-based Dementia Programming with their residents.

History 

Research of MBDP has been conducted more than ten years by Dr. Cameron Camp (the creator of MBDP) and the staff of the Myers Research Institute.

Recognition 
MBDP received the Excellence in Research and Education Award from the American Association of Homes and Services for the Aging (AAHSA). The creators of MBDP also received the 2004 Healthcare and Aging Award given by the American Society on Aging (ASA).

The science behind this work has been best described in scientific articles and trade journals, ranging from The Gerontologist to Activity Director's Quarterly and from Caring (the magazine of the National Association for Home Care) to Topics in Geriatric Rehab.  It has also been featured in a story in the AARP Bulletin.

On 11-28-07 the Cleveland Plain Dealer ran a story about MBDP on the front page of the Metro section.  This story highlights the use of the technique in a long-term care facility.

External links 
Myers Research Institute

Dementia